Laënnec Hurbon (sometimes anglicised as Laennec Hurbon; born 1940) is a Haitian sociologist and writer specialising in the relationships between religion, culture and politics in the Caribbean region. He is also a Catholic theologian and ex-priest turned researcher and writer.

Career 
Hurbon was born in Jacmel, a commune in southern Haiti. He is Doctor of Theology (Institut Catholique de Paris) and Sociology (Sorbonne University), director of research at CNRS and professor at the Quisqueya University in Port-au-Prince, of which he is one of the founding members. Today he focuses on the relationships between religion, culture and politics in the Caribbean region and has written many books on Haitian Vodou.

He also edited a collective work entitled  (2014).

Publications

Publications by Hurbon
 Dieu dans le Vaudou haïtien. Éditions Payot, 1972
 Culture et dictature en Haïti : l'imaginaire sous contrôle. L'Harmattan, 1979
 Le Barbare imaginaire. Éditions Henri Deschamps, 1987
 Comprendre Haïti : Essai sur l'État, la nation, la culture. Karthala, 1987
 Le phénomène religieux dans la Caraïbe. Karthala, 1989
 Les mystères du vaudou. Collection "Découvertes Gallimard" (nº 190). série Religions. Éditions Gallimard, 1993
 Voodoo: Truth and Fantasy, 'New Horizons' series. Thames & Hudson, 1995. UK edition
 Voodoo: Search for the Spirit, "Abrams Discoveries" series. Harry N. Abrams, 1995. U.S. edition

Publication edited by Hurbon
 Catastrophes et environnement : Haïti, séisme du 12 janvier 2010. Éditions de l'EHESS, 2014. Various authors.

Interviews with Hurbon

 A crise do Haiti é reflexo da corrupção com endosso internacional. Entrevista especial com Laënnec Hurbon 2019.

References 

1940 births
Living people
Haitian sociologists
Sociologists of religion
Institut Catholique de Paris alumni
Paris-Sorbonne University alumni
The New York Review of Books people
Haitian Vodou researchers
Haitian Roman Catholic priests
Haitian expatriates in France
People from Jacmel
20th-century Roman Catholic theologians
21st-century Roman Catholic theologians